Forbes 30 Under 30 is a set of lists of people under 30 years old issued annually by Forbes magazine and some of its regional editions. The American lists recognize 600 business and industry figures, with 30 selected in twenty industries each. Asia and Europe also each have ten categories for a total of 300 each, while Africa has a single list of 30 people. Forbes hosts associated conferences and a section of its website called 30 Under 30. The nomination process for Forbes 30 Under 30 is open to the public, and people may nominate themselves or another as long as the nominee is under 30 years of age.

History
Forbes launched its 30 Under 30 list in 2011 under the direction of Randall Lane. By 2016, the nominations for the list had reached more than 15.000, with Forbes editors selecting 30 winners for each of 20 categories.

Over time, Forbes has expanded the feature to establish continental lists for Asia, Europe (launched in 2016), and Africa.

Forbes also uses the Under 30 name for a dedicated channel on its website, associated with a 30 Under 30 social media app. The Washington Post reports the channel aims to provide "millennial-focused programming to the magazine's many influential consumers." The social media app is a collaboration with Tinder via previous 30 Under 30 honoree Sean Rad, cofounder and president of Tinder.

Conferences
In addition to the magazine feature, Forbes hosts an annual 30 Under 30 Summit. In 2014 and 2015, the summit was held in Philadelphia, with Monica Lewinsky making headlines at the first summit for her address on cyberbullying. The 2016 and 2017 summits were both held in October in Boston. Organizers include previous 30 Under 30 honorees chef Chris Coombs, Boston mayoral aide Dan Koh, and pediatric oncology professor Cigall Kadoch.

In April 2016, Forbes held its first 30 Under 30 international summit, focused on Europe, the Middle East and Africa and taking place in Tel Aviv and Jerusalem. Speakers included Monica Lewinsky, Shimon Peres and Okieriete Onaodowan. Onaodowan was a 2016 honoree on the 30 Under 30 Hollywood & Entertainment list for his portrayal of Hercules Mulligan and James Madison in Hamilton.

On December 9, 2020, Forbes hosted the virtual "2020 Forbes Power Women's Summit" to recognize women who lead major movements and build billion-dollar businesses.

Botswana was the first African country to host Forbes 30 Under 30 in April 2022.

Diversity of honorees
The 30 Under 30 list has drawn some criticism, including for under-recognition of young racial minorities and women. The Root observed that 29 of 30 journalists honored on the inaugural media list in 2011 were white, and none of African descent,  or Latino of any race. Elle South Africa noted the gender imbalance of the 2014 lists, asking, "Where are the women?" Demographics of the Forbes selections have continued to draw interest; Poynter reported the 2015 Media list had 18 women, the most in the list's five-year history.

In response to criticism, Forbes launched in 2020 "Power Rising: These Are The Women To Watch" along with publishing a list of the world's 100 most powerful women. In 2021, Forbes published "Black Futures Month: 8 Black Entrepreneurs to Watch" and launched Forbes EQ (Equity Quotient), a platform where businesses, entrepreneurs and nonprofit organizations from underrepresented groups share their experiences.

See also
Fortunes 40 Under 40
The Business Journals Forty Under 40

References

Further reading 

 Forbes 30 Under 30 now on Botswana’s doorstep – The Business Weekly & Review

External links
 

2011 introductions
Lists of 21st-century people
Forbes lists